Makedonikos B.C. (Greek: Μακεδονικός K.A.E.) is a Greek professional basketball club. The club is located in Neapoli, Thessaloniki, Greece. The parent athletic club was founded in 1928, and the basketball department was founded in 1948. Makedonikos means "Macedonian" in Greek.

History
Makedonikos won the Greek A2 League, which is the second-tier league in Greece, in the years 2000 and 2002. During the 2001–02 season, the team set the then A2 season record for most wins, with 24. Makedonikos was the runner-up of the EuroCup's 2004–05 season.

Since its foundation in 1948, Makedonikos' home city was Thessaloniki, Greece. Otherwise, when the team was bought by Dimitris Mesaikos, the franchise was moved to Kozani, Greece, in the mid 2000s, to play in a newer, larger arena that had just opened there. The team returned to Thessaloniki, Greece, after it had financial problems while playing in Kozani.

Makedonikos competed in the top-tier level Greek Basket League for several years, until going bankrupt in 2007, when it was relegated to the third-tier level Greek B League.

Arenas
Makedonios plays its domestic home games at the 600 seat Makedonikos Indoor Hall, which is located in Thessaloniki, Greece. When the club was located in Kozani, Greece, they played their homes games at the 1,500 seat Ioannis Skarkalas Indoor Hall.

Titles and honors
2× Greek 2nd Division Champion: (2000, 2002)
EuroCup Finalist: (2005)

Notable players

Greece
  Georgios Balogiannis
  Nikos Boudouris
  Kostas Charalampidis
  Panagiotis Kafkis
  Lefteris Kakiousis
  Vangelis Karampoulas
  Sotiris Karapostolou
  Manthos Katsoulis
  Markos Kolokas
  Nestoras Kommatos
  Panagiotis Liadelis
  Pantelis Papaioakeim
  Manos Papamakarios
  Dimitris Papanikolaou
  Alekos Petroulas
  Georgios Sigalas
  Dimitris Spanoulis

USA
  William Avery
  Walter Berry
  Elton Brown
  Terrel Castle
  Joe Ira Clark
  Ben Davis
  Ben Handlogten
  Jason Hart
  Andre Hutson
  Dewayne Jefferson
  Pete Mickeal
  Scoonie Penn
  Rashad Phillips
  Dickey Simpkins
  Alvin Sims
  Charles Smith
  Major Wingate

Europe
 - Dušan Jelić
  Dušan Kecman
  Grigorij Khizhnyak
  Dragan Lukovski
  Nikita Morgunov
  Slaven Rimac
  Bojan Stević

Oceania
  Shane Heal

Head coaches 
  Soulis Markopoulos
  Zvi Sherf
  Argyris Pedoulakis
  Kostas Flevarakis
  Antonis Baksevanis

References

External links
Official Website 
Eurobasket.com Team Page

Basketball teams established in 1948
Basketball teams in Greece
Sports clubs in Thessaloniki